Machaerium is the scientific name of two genera of organisms and may refer to:

Machaerium (fly), a genus of insects in the family Dolichopodidae
Machaerium (plant), a genus of plants in the family Fabaceae